Rosa del Carmen Bruno-Jofré  (1946) is a historian. She is a professor and former Dean of Education at Queen's University. In 2019, Bruno-Jofré was elected a Fellow of the Royal Society of Canada.

Career
Bruno-Jofré moved to Canada in 1977. After earning her PhD from the University of Calgary, she accepted academic positions with Western Washington University and the University of Manitoba. After serving three years at the University of Manitoba as an Associate Dean of Education, she joined the faculty of Queen's University as the Dean of Education. She spent 10 years in this role before being replaced. As Dean of Education, she was the recipient of the 2004 Lamp of Learning Award given by the Ontario Secondary School Teachers' Federation.

After stepping down as Dean, Bruno-Jofré and James Scott Johnston co-edited a book titled "Teacher Education in a Transnational World." The next year, Bruno-Jofré and Paulí Dávila received a Social Sciences and Humanities Research Council (SSHRC) grant for their study entitled Catholicism and Education: Fifty Years After Vatican II (1962-1965): A Transnational Interdisciplinary Encounter. Two years later, she was honoured with the 2018 G.E. Clerk Award by the Canadian Catholic Historical Association for excellence in Catholic studies and by Queen's for her research and leadership skills. TD Canada Trust also named Bruno-Jofré one of the 10 most influential Hispanic Canadians. The following year, she was elected a Fellow of the Royal Society of Canada.

Books

Books: Author 

 The Missionary Oblate Sisters: Vision and Mission. 2005. Montréal and Kingston, London and Ithaca: McGill/Queen’s University Press.  Also translated into French. (Shortlisted for the Margaret McWilliams Award in the category of scholarly history for 2005.)
 Methodist Education in Peru: Social Gospel, Politics, and American Ideological and Economic Penetration, 1888‑1930. 1988. Waterloo, Ontario: Canadian Corporation for Studies in Religion – Wilfrid Laurier University Press.
 The Sisters of Our Lady of Missions:  From Ultramontanism to a New Cosmology. 2020.

Books: Co-Author 

 Rosa Bruno-Jofré, Heidi McDonald, and Elizabeth Smyth. November 2017. Vatican II and Beyond: The Changing Mission and Identity of Canadian Women Religious. 
 Rosa Bruno-Jofré, Scott J. Johnston, Gonzalo Jover, and Daniel Trohler. 2010. Democracy and the Intersection of Religion and Traditions: The Readings of John Dewey's Understanding of Democracy and Education. Montréal and Kingston, London and Ithaca: McGill/Queen’s University Press.

Books: Editor and Co-Editor 

 Rosa Bruno-Jofré (Ed.). 2019. Educationalization and its Complexities: Religion, Politics, and Technology, Toronto: ON: University of Toronto Press.
 Rosa Bruno-Jofré and Jon Igelmo Zaldívar (Eds.). 2017. Catholic Education in the Wake of Vatican II. Toronto, ON: University of Toronto Press.
 Rosa Bruno-Jofré and James Scott Johnston (Eds.). 2014. Teacher Education in a Transnational World. Toronto: University of Toronto Press.
 Rosa Bruno-Jofré and Jürgen Schriewer (Eds.). 2011. The Global Reception of John Dewey’s Thought: Multiple Refractions Through Time and Space. New York & London, Routledge.
 Rosa Bruno-Jofré and Natalia Aponiuk. (Eds.). 2001. Educating Citizens for a Pluralistic Society. Calgary: Canadian Ethnic Studies Association.
 Rosa Bruno-Jofré. 1993. (Ed.). Issues in the History of Education in Manitoba: From the Construction of the Common School to the Politics of Voices. New York: Edwin Mellen Press.

References

External links 
 

Living people
1946 births
Canadian women historians
Canadian women academics
University of Calgary alumni
Academic staff of the University of Manitoba
Academic staff of Queen's University at Kingston
Argentine emigrants to Canada
21st-century Canadian historians